Floria Gueï (born 2 May 1990) is a French sprint athlete of Ivorian origin specialising in the 400 metres. A 2016 European Championships silver medallist and a 2017 European Indoor Championships gold medallist, she also won as a member of women's 4x400 m relays a bronze at the 2013 World Championships and medals at several other international competitions.

Gueï is known for her remarkable last leg at the 2014 European Championships relay final, when she went from fourth to first in the last 50 metres of the race.

Career
Gueï has won 4 medals in the 4x400 metres relay at the consecutive European Championships in 2012-18; three silver and a gold in 2014.

She was first selected for the event's French A team in 2010, when she ran in the heats.

In August 2014 at the European Championships in Zurich Floria Gueï ran one of the most remarkable final legs of a 4 x 400m relay ever seen. She took the baton in fourth place approximately a second behind the three leading runners from the UK, Russia and Ukraine, each of whom had run faster than Gueï in the individual 400m event at the Championships. With 200m remaining she still appeared out of medal contention but finished with a sprint in which she passed all the other athletes in the last 50m to win the race for France at the last stride by 0.05 seconds. Her time for the leg was 49.71, almost two seconds faster than her personal best of 51.42 at the time, prompting the exclamation from an ecstatic French TV commentator "but that is not possible!" (mais ce n'est pas possible!).

In July 2016, Gueï won a silver medal in the 400 metres at the European Championships. She won a gold medal in the event at the 2017 European Indoor Championships.

In July 2017, Gueï announced her withdrawal from the 2017 World Championships due to medical issues.

In July 2018, she finished second in the 400 metres at the World Cup, and returned later that evening to anchor the 4x400 metres relay with remarkable run, pulling France from a distant fifth to take a bronze medal.

In February 2019, Gueï announced her pregnancy on her Instagram account, and gave birth to a boy on 23 April. She then returned to training, and took part in two competitions in 2020.

She qualified for the 4x400 m relay at the 2021's 2020 Tokyo Olympics.

Achievements

International competitions

Circuit wins
 Diamond League meetings
 2016 (1) (400 m): Birmingham British Grand Prix

National titles
 French Athletics Championships
 400 m (4): 2013, 2015, 2016, 2018Four-times runner-up in the distance (2012, 2014, 2017, 2021).
 400 m indoor (1): 2011

References

External links

 

1990 births
Living people
French sportspeople of Ivorian descent
French female sprinters
Sportspeople from Nantes
Athletes (track and field) at the 2012 Summer Olympics
Athletes (track and field) at the 2016 Summer Olympics
Olympic athletes of France
European Athletics Championships medalists
World Athletics Championships athletes for France
Black French sportspeople
Athletes (track and field) at the 2020 Summer Olympics
Olympic female sprinters